Difficult Shapes & Passive Rhythms Some People Think It's Fun to Entertain is the debut studio album by English new wave band China Crisis, released on 12 November 1982 by Virgin Records. It spent 17 weeks on the UK Albums Chart and peaked at number 21 in February 1983.

Recording
The album was recorded during a long period of time in different studios with different producers. Half the album that eventually made up side two on the album was recorded on an eight-track studio in Liverpool before China Crisis had signed a recording contract with Virgin Records. "African and White" was produced by Jeremy Lewis. The other half of the album that made up side one was produced by Steve Levine (two tracks) and Peter Walsh (three tracks).

Critical reception

In a retrospective AllMusic review Stephen Schnee wrote that the duo of Gary Daly and Eddie Lundon "made their fascinating debut, Difficult Shapes & Passive Rhythms, Some People Think It's Fun to Entertain, on a low budget, and their magic was already in place, especially on the Steely Dan-ish "No More Blue Horizons," the upbeat groove of "Some People I Know to Lead Fantastic Lives" and "You Never See It", the gorgeous "Christian," and their early hit "African and White." Their quirkiness doesn't quite translate on a few tracks ("Temptation's Big Blue Eyes" and "Are We a Worker"), but the charm of this album will win you over if you like smart, yet slightly eccentric, pop songs. It is plainly obvious that, no matter how uncommercial a particular song may be, the boys in China Crisis put their heart and soul into it, creating something uniquely their own, and building upon it."

In a Trouser Press review of the album Jim Green wrote: "The rhythms — R&B, funk, reggae, Afro-gypsy, bossa nova — are so gently, modestly, melodiously proffered that it goes down too smoothly. Then you notice that the dreamily enunciated sentiments interface the political and the personal, with hopeful dreams and admissions of self-doubt and inner struggle. The cohesive feel is maintained despite four different producers; China Crisis' sturdy intellectual backbone emerges often enough to avoid wimpiness."

Track listing
All songs are written by Gary Daly, Eddie Lundon and Dave Reilly.

Side one: Difficult Side
 "Seven Sports for All" – 3:18
 "No More Blue Horizons (Fool, Fool, Fool)" – 3:48
 "Feel to Be Driven Away" – 2:55
 "Some People I Know to Lead Fantastic Lives" – 3:33
 "Christian" – 5:37

Side two: Entertainment Side
 "African and White" – 3:46
 "Are We a Worker" – 3:30
 "Red Sails" – 4:43
 "You Never See It" – 2:57
 "Temptation's Big Blue Eyes" – 3:25
 "Jean Walks in Fresh Fields" – 1:53

Personnel
China Crisis
 Gary Daly – vocals, synthesizer, bass on tracks 6, 10
 Eddie Lundon – guitar, vocals, synthesizer on tracks 1, 9 and percussion on tracks 2, 8
 Dave Reilly – drums, percussion + synthesizer on tracks 1, 9

Other personnel
 George McFarlane – bass on track 1
 Pete Walsh – synthesizer (solo) on track 2, electric piano (chord organ) on track 5
 Frank Walsh – trumpet on track 2
 Andy Pask – fretless bass on track 5
 Mike Timoney – synthesizer on track 7
 Jean – vocals on track 7, 10

Production and artwork
 Steve Levine – Tracks 1, 3
 Peter Walsh – Tracks 2, 4, 5
 Jeremy Lewis – Track 6
 Gil Norton and China Crisis – Tracks 7–11
 Peter Saville Associates - cover design

References

External links
 

1982 debut albums
China Crisis albums
Albums produced by Steve Levine
Albums produced by Gil Norton
Virgin Records albums
Albums produced by Peter Walsh